Gino Paolo Alucema Dinamarca (born 26 September 1992) is a Chilean footballer who currently plays for Primera B de Chile side Magallanes.

References
 Profile at BDFA  
 

1992 births
Living people
Chilean footballers
Everton de Viña del Mar footballers
Primera B de Chile players
Chilean Primera División players
Association football defenders